Oribasius or Oreibasius (c. 320 – 403) was a Greek medical writer and the personal physician of the Roman emperor Julian.  He studied at Alexandria under physician Zeno of Cyprus before joining Julian's retinue.  He was involved in Julian's coronation in 361, and remained with the emperor until Julian's death in 363.  In the wake of this event, Oribasius was banished to foreign courts for a time, but was later recalled by the emperor Valens.

Works
Oribasius's major works, written at the behest of Julian, are two collections of excerpts from the writings of earlier medical scholars, a collection of excerpts from Galen and the Medical Collections (Ἰατρικαὶ Συναγωγαί, Iatrikai Synagogai; Latin: Collectiones medicae), a massive compilation of excerpts from other medical writers of the ancient world.  The first of these works is entirely lost, and only 25 of the 70 (or 72) books of the Collectiones survive. This work preserves a number of excerpts from older writers whose writings have otherwise been lost, and has thus been valuable to modern scholars.  The earliest known description of a string figure, presented as the surgical sling Plinthios Brokhos by Greek physician Heraklas, is among the preserved material.

Hagiography has it that in 362, on behalf of his emperor Julian, Oribasius visited the Delphic oracle, now in a rather desolate state, offering his emperor's services to the temple and, in return, receiving one of the last prophecies by the Delphic Pythia:

Tell the king, the splendid hall fell to the ground.
Phoebus no longer has his house, nor the prophesying laurel,
nor the speaking well. The speaking water has dried out.
— Passio Artemii 96.1284.45–7, Cedrenus 1.532.8–10)

Notes

References
Browning, Robert and Nutton, Vivian, "Oribasius", from The Oxford Classical Dictionary, Simon Hornblower and Antony Spawforth, ed. (Oxford University Press, 2003) 
Grant, Mark (author and translator) and Oribasius, Dieting for an Emperor: A Translation of Books 1 and 4 of Oribasius’ „Medical Compilations“. Brill Academic Publishers, Leiden – New York – Cologne 1997; 
Haars, Maximilian (author and translator), Die allgemeinen Wirkungspotenziale der einfachen Arzneimittel bei Galen. Oreibasios, Collectiones medicae XV. Einleitung, Übersetzung und pharmazeutischer Kommentar. Wissenschaftliche Verlagsgesellschaft, Stuttgart 2018; 
Musgrove, Caroline Joanne. Oribasius’ Woman: Medicine, Christianity and Society in Late Antiquity. Doctoral thesis, University of Cambridge, 2017. 
Oribasius: Collectionum Medicarum Reliquiae, I. Libri I-VIII; II; IX-XVI. By J. Raeder (Corpus Medicorum Graecorum VI.1.1–2) Leipzig & Berlin, Teubner 1928–9. (online)
Thompson, E.A. "The Last Delphic Oracle." CQ 40.1 (1946): 35–6.

4th-century Romans
4th-century Greek physicians
320 births
403 deaths
Julian (emperor)
4th-century writers